The 2012–13 Segunda Liga was the 23rd season of the second-tier of football in Portugal. This season marked a series of changes in the league overall. The league's name was changed back to Segunda Liga from the previous Liga de Honra. A total of 22 teams contested the league, up from 16 in the previous season; 14 of which contested the 2011–12 season, two of which were promoted from the Portuguese Second Division (including a reserve team), one of which was relegated from the 2011–12 Primeira Liga, and five of which were new reserve teams of Primeira Liga clubs.  The reserve teams were not eligible for promotion to the Primeira Liga.

Events
União de Leiria were relegated to the second division due to not fulfilling the mandatory requirements by the Portuguese League for Professional Football regarding the application process to professional competitions. Thus, Sporting Covilhã was invited to stay in the Segunda Liga despite being relegated in the previous season.

Varzim, the 2011–12 Segunda Divisão champions, also did not fulfill the requirements and were not registered in the Segunda Liga. Again, Portimonense were invited to remain in the Segunda Liga.

Teams

{{Location map+|Portugal Madeira|float=right|width=250|caption=Location of teams in Liga de Honra 2012–13|places=

}}

Changes in 2012–13Teams relegated from 2011–12 Primeira Liga 15th Place: FeirenseTeams promoted to 2012–13 Primeira Liga Champions: Estoril
 Runners-up: MoreirenseTeams promoted from 2011–12 Portuguese Second Division Runners-up: Tondela
 12th place (Serie C): Marítimo BNew teams entering directly to the 2012–13 Segunda Liga'''
 Benfica B
 Braga B
 Porto B
 Sporting CP B
 Vitória de Guimarães B

Stadia and locations

Personnel and kits

Note: Flags indicate national team as has been defined under FIFA eligibility rules. Players and Managers may hold more than one non-FIFA nationality.

Managerial changes

League table

Positions by round

Results

Season statistics

Top goalscorers

Hat-tricks

Awards

Monthly awards

SJPF Segunda Liga Player of the Month

SJPF Segunda Liga Young Player of the Month

Annual awards

LPFP Segunda Liga Player of the Year 
The LPFP Segunda Liga Player of the Year was awarded to Miguel Rosa of Benfica. Rosa became the first player to win the award twice after previously winning the award in relation to the 2010–11 season.

LPFP Segunda Liga Breakthrough Player of the Year 
Sporting CP B's Bruma was awarded with the LPFP Segunda Liga Breakthrough Player of the Year award.

LPFP Segunda Liga Goalkeeper of the Year 
The LPFP Segunda Liga Goalkeeper of the Year was awarded to Matt Jones of Belenenses.

LPFP Segunda Liga Manager of the Year 
Belenenses' Mitchell van der Gaag was the recipient of the LPFP Segunda Liga Manager of the Year award.

LPFP Segunda Liga Fairplay Award 
The LPFP Segunda Liga Fairplay Award was awarded to Benfica B.

See also
2012–13 Primeira Liga

References

Liga Portugal 2 seasons
Port
2012–13 in Portuguese football leagues